The 70-300mm lens is a telephoto zoom lens made by Nikon.
The lens has an F-mount to work with all the SLRs line of cameras (except the early 70-300G with the D40), although the more recent AF-P lenses will not focus on film SLRs or older DSLRs (roughly before 2013).

The lens comes in seven different versions:
 AF 4-5.6G
 AF 4-5.6D
 AF 4-5.6D ED
 AF-S 4.5-5.6G IF-ED
 AF-P 4.5-6.3G IF-ED DX
 AF-P 4.5-6.3G IF-ED DX VR
 AF-P 4.5-5.6E IF-ED VR

It is the successor of the 70-210 lens, which targets the prosumer market, one grade lower than 80-200mm with large aperture.

Introduced in August 2006, the current incarnation of the lens (AF-S VR 4.5-5.6G IF-ED) improves on the original with VR stabilization technology as well as with internally focusing components (IF). More expensive than its partner 55-200mm lens, its construction is similar, with the exterior shell being fabricated from plastic components. This is extremely lightweight telephoto lens.  It also shares a similarly stiff zoom ring with the 55-200mm, although a side benefit of this is that zoom creep is eliminated. Unlike the 55-200, the 70-300mm lens is full-frame. Also, the longer barrel length allowed the focus ring to be relocated in front of the zoom ring, making manual focus operations simpler.

Specifications

See also
List of Nikon compatible lenses with integrated autofocus-motor
Nikon F 70-210mm lens
Nikon F 80-200mm lens
Canon EF 70-300mm lens

References

Nikon F-mount lenses
Camera lenses introduced in 2006